John Michael Piersma (born January 25, 1975) is an American former competition swimmer who represented the United States at the 1996 Summer Olympics in Atlanta.  Piersma competed in the B Finals of the men's 200-meter freestyle and men's 400-meter freestyle.  In the 200-meter freestyle, he finished twelfth overall with a time 1:49.90; he placed ninth overall in the 400-meter freestyle with a time of 3:50.69.

Piersma attended Grissom High School in Huntsville, Alabama, and led the swim team to three state championships.  In college, he swam for the Michigan Wolverines, winning three Big Ten Conference championships and the 1995 national championship.  After his swimming career, Piersma graduated from the University of Michigan Medical School.

See also
 List of University of Michigan alumni

References

1975 births
Living people
American male freestyle swimmers
Michigan Wolverines men's swimmers
Olympic swimmers of the United States
Sportspeople from Huntsville, Alabama
Swimmers at the 1996 Summer Olympics
University of Michigan Medical School alumni